is a Japanese actor and model.

Biography
Masao Kusakari was born in Fukuoka Prefecture to a Japanese mother and an American father, the latter who died in the Korean War. Considered stunningly good looking, his debut into the public eye began when he became a model for Shiseido Cosmetics in the early 1970's. He joined Toho in 1974 and began his career as a screen actor. He won his first major award at the Elan d'or Awards in 1975, and a year later, appeared in Kaze to Kumo to Niji to, a dream of his since early childhood to star in a taiga drama. From then to the early 1980's, Kusakari was one of the most popular actors in Japan. 

He won popularity again through his role in Sanada Maru in 2016. In 2017, Kusakari won Best Supporting Actor of 10th Tokyo Drama Awards for his role in Sanada Maru.
In 2019, Kusakari appeared in the Asadora Natsuzora and played an important role that has a great influence on leading character Natsu's life.

Filmography

Film

Television dramas

Dubbing

Awards and prizes

References

External links
Official profile 

1952 births
Japanese male actors
Living people
Japanese people of American descent
Actors from Fukuoka Prefecture
Models from Fukuoka Prefecture
Japanese male models